Autocar may refer to:

 Autocar (magazine), a weekly British automobile magazine (founded 1895)
 Autocar Company (founded 1897), an American manufacturer of cab over engine vocational trucks and the oldest motor vehicle brand in the Western hemisphere
 Autocars Co., an Israeli car manufacturer
 Auster Autocar, a 1940s single-engined touring monoplane
 Coach (vehicle)
 1903 Petrol Electric Autocar, an experimental railcar built by the North Eastern Railway in 1903 using a Petrol Electric Engine

See also 
 Otokar, a Turkish manufacturer of buses and military vehicles